Charles H. Roadman II (born November 27, 1943 in San Antonio, Texas) was the 16th United States Air Force Surgeon General (1996–1999), Headquarters U.S. Air Force, Bolling Air Force Base, Washington D.C. His father, Charles H. Roadman (1914–2000), was also an Air Force flight surgeon and command pilot.

Education
1967 Bachelor of Science degree in geology, Washington and Lee University, Lexington, Virginia
1973 Doctor of Medicine degree, Emory University School of Medicine, Atlanta, Georgia
1974 Squadron Officer School, by correspondence
1977 Internship and residency in obstetrics and gynecology, Keesler Medical Center, Keesler Air Force Base, Mississippi
1979 Air Command and Staff College, by seminar
1985 National War College, Fort Lesley J. McNair, Washington, D.C.

Career
Roadman entered the Air Force in May 1968. After receiving his medical degree from Emory University School of Medicine, he completed his internship and residency in obstetrics and gynecology (OB/GYN) at Keesler Medical Center.

Roadman served as a commander three times, twice in a hospital and once in a medical center. He was also a major command deputy surgeon, surgeon and command surgeon of both U.S. Transportation Command and Air Mobility Command. He served as both commander, Air Force Medical Operations Agency and deputy surgeon general, Office of the Air Force Surgeon General. He assumed duties as Surgeon General in November 1996. He retired from the Air Force on December 1, 1999.

Assignments

July 1968 – September 1969, clinical laboratory officer, Wilford Hall USAF Medical Center, Lackland Air Force Base, Texas
September 1969 – June 1973, training status at AFIT, Emory University, Atlanta, Georgia
July 1973 – July 1977, internship, then residency in obstetrics and gynecology, Keesler Medical Center, Keesler Air Force Base, Mississippi
July 1977 – July 1980, staff obstetrician, then chief of obstetrics and gynecology, later chief of surgical services, then chief of hospital services, 401st Tactical Hospital, Torrejon Air Base, Spain
July 1980 – July 1983, commander, 20th Tactical Fighter Wing Hospital, Royal Air Force Upper Heyford, England
July 1983 – July 1985, commander, 554th Medical Group, Nellis Air Force Base, Nevada
August 1985 – June 1986, student, National War College, Fort Lesley J. McNair, Washington, D.C.
June 1986 – January 1988, director, professional services-aerospace medicine and deputy surgeon, Headquarters Strategic Air Command, Offutt Air Force Base, Nebraska
January 1988 – May 1990, commander, USAF Medical Center, Wright-Patterson Air Force Base, Ohio
May 1990 – September 1991, command surgeon, Headquarters U.S. Air Forces in Europe, Ramstein Air Base, West Germany
September 1991 – July 1994, command surgeon, U.S. Transportation Command and Military Airlift Command, then Air Mobility Command, Scott Air Force Base, Illinois
July 1994 – November 1996, commander and director, Air Force Medical Operations Agency, Office of the Surgeon General, Bolling Air Force Base, D.C.
November 1996 – October 1999, surgeon general, Headquarters U.S. Air Force, Bolling Air Force Base, D.C.

Awards and decorations

Defense Superior Service Medal
Legion of Merit with oak leaf cluster
Meritorious Service Medal with oak leaf cluster
Air Force Commendation Medal

Academia
Roadman was Assistant Dean, Wright State Medical School (1988); the Distinguished Professor of Preventive Medicine at the Uniformed Services University of Health Sciences (1997–1999), and Adjunct Professor of Health Services Management and Leadership at The George Washington University School of Public Health and Health Services.

Later career
After retiring from the Air Force, Roadman moved into the public health sector as President and CEO of the American Health Care Association (AHCA) (1999–2004) Dr. Roadman also served as interim president and CEO of Assisted Living Concepts as well as Chairman of the Board of Trustees of Altarum. He is currently on Altarum's Advisory Board.

Notes

References

1943 births
Living people
Surgeons General of the United States Air Force
Emory University School of Medicine alumni
People from San Antonio
Recipients of the Legion of Merit
Washington and Lee University alumni
Recipients of the Defense Superior Service Medal